Events from the year 1950 in France.

Incumbents
President: Vincent Auriol 
President of the Council of Ministers: 
 until 2 July: Georges Bidault
 2 July-12 July: Henri Queuille
 starting 12 July: René Pleven

Events
11 February – Two Viet Cong battalions attack a French base in French Indochina.
12 February – Pro-communist riots in Paris.
9 April – Notre-Dame Affair, Lettrist movement anti-Catholic intervention.
3 June – Herzog and Lachenal of the French Annapurna expedition become the first climbers to reach the summit of an 8,000-metre peak.
15–18 September – Battle of Đông Khê, French defeat in First Indochina War.
30 September – Battle of Route Coloniale 4 begins.
18 October – Battle of Route Coloniale 4 ends in decisive victory for the Việt Minh.
20 October – Henri Martin affair: a sailor is imprisoned for distributing propaganda hostile to the First Indochina War.

Sport
13 July – Tour de France begins.
7 August – Tour de France ends, won by Ferdinand Kübler of Switzerland.

Births
22 February – Miou-Miou, actress.
21 April – Michel Rougerie, motorcycle racer (died 1981)
8 May – Aimé Venel, painter
9 August
 Anémone, French actress, filmmaker and political activist (died 2019)
 Nicole Tourneur, French novelist (died 2011)
25 September – Philippe Peythieu, actor.

Deaths
6 February – Georges Imbert, chemical engineer (born 1884)
2 March – Joseph d'Arbaud, poet (born 1874)
6 March – Albert Lebrun, politician and President of France (born 1871)
16 April – Arnaud Massy, golfer (born 1877)
28 September – Joë Bousquet, poet (born 1897)
10 November – Jean Biondi, politician (born 1900; car crash)
11 November – Pierre-Jules Boulanger, engineer and businessman (born 1885; car crash)

See also
 List of French films of 1950

References

1950s in France